This is a list of flag bearers who have represented Vietnam at the Olympics.

Flag bearers carry the national flag of their country at the opening ceremony of the Olympic Games.

See also
Vietnam at the Olympics

References

Vietnam at the Olympics
Vietnam
Olympic flagbearers
Olympic flagbearers